Arachniodes is a fern genus in the family Dryopteridaceae (wood ferns), subfamily Dryopteridoideae, in the Pteridophyte Phylogeny Group classification of 2016 (PPG I). A number of species in this genus are known as "holly ferns".

The genus Arachniodes was first published by Carl Ludwig von Blume in 1828, with the single Indonesian species Arachniodes aspidioides.  The genus was not widely recognized until Mary Douglas Tindale transferred the two species (Byrsopteris amabilis and Byrsopteris aristata) into it in 1961.

Species
The Pteridophyte Phylogeny Group classification of 2016 (PPG I) considers Arachniodes to have 60 species. , the Checklist of Ferns and Lycophytes of the World accepted 78 species:

Arachniodes ailaoshanensis Ching
Arachniodes amabilis (Blume) Tindale
Arachniodes amoena (Ching) Ching
Arachniodes aristata (G.Forst.) Tindale
Arachniodes assamica (Kuhn) Ohwi
Arachniodes bella (C.Chr.) Ching
Arachniodes blinii (H.Lév.) Nakaike
Arachniodes carvifolia (Kunze) Ching
Arachniodes caudata Ching
Arachniodes cavaleriei (Christ) Ohwi
Arachniodes chinensis (Rosenst.) Ching
Arachniodes coniifolia (T.Moore) Ching
Arachniodes cornucervi (D.Don) Fraser-Jenk.
Arachniodes daklakensis Li Bing Zhang, N.T.Lu & X.M.Zhou
Arachniodes davalliaeformis (Christ) Nakaike
Arachniodes denticulata (Sw.) Ching
Arachniodes fengii Ching
Arachniodes festina (Hance) Ching
Arachniodes formosa (Fée) Ching
Arachniodes formosissima (Goldm.) Nakaike
Arachniodes gigantea Ching
Arachniodes globisora (Hayata) Ching
Arachniodes grossa (Tardieu & C.Chr.) Ching
Arachniodes hainanensis (Ching) Ching
Arachniodes haniffii (Holttum) Ching
Arachniodes hehaii Li Bing Zhang, N.T.Lu & X.F.Gao
Arachniodes hekiana Kurata
Arachniodes henryi (Christ) Ching
Arachniodes hiugana Sa. Kurata
Arachniodes hunanensis Ching
Arachniodes insularis W.H.Wagner
Arachniodes japonica (Kurata) Nakaike
Arachniodes jinpingensis Y.T.Hsieh
Arachniodes leucostegioides (C.Chr.) Ching
Arachniodes longicaudata Li Bing Zhang, N.T.Lu & Liang Zhang
Arachniodes longipinna Ching
Arachniodes microlepioides (C.Chr.) comb. ined.
Arachniodes miqueliana (Maxim. ex Franch. & Sav.) Ohwi
Arachniodes miyakei (H.Itô) Shimura ex Nakaike
Arachniodes mutica (Franch. & Sav.) Ohwi
Arachniodes neopodophylla (Ching) Nakaike
Arachniodes nigrospinosa (Ching) Ching
Arachniodes nipponica (Rosenst.) Ohwi
Arachniodes oosorae H.Itô
Arachniodes palmipes (Kunze) Fraser-Jenk.
Arachniodes pseudoaristata (Tagawa) Ohwi
Arachniodes pseudoassamica Ching
Arachniodes pseudorepens Nakaike
Arachniodes puncticulata (Alderw.) Ching
Arachniodes quadripinnata (Hayata) Seriz.
Arachniodes quangnamensis Li Bing Zhang, N.T.Lu & Liang Zhang
Arachniodes repens Kurata
Arachniodes rhomboidea (Schott) Ching
Arachniodes rigidissima (Hook.) Ching
Arachniodes sarasiniorum (Christ) Nakaike
Arachniodes simplicior (Makino) Ohwi
Arachniodes simulans (Ching) Ching
Arachniodes sinomiqueliana (Ching) Ohwi
Arachniodes sinorhomboidea Ching
Arachniodes sledgei Fraser-Jenk.
Arachniodes spectabilis (Ching) Ching
Arachniodes squamulosa R.C.Moran & B. Øllg.
Arachniodes standishii (T.Moore) Ohwi
Arachniodes subamabilis Kurata
Arachniodes superba Fraser-Jenk.
Arachniodes tomitae Sa. Kurata
Arachniodes tonkinensis (Ching) Ching
Arachniodes tripinnata (Goldm.) Sledge
Arachniodes tsiangiana (Ching) Nakaike
Arachniodes webbiana (A.Braun) Schelpe
Arachniodes wulingshanensis S.F.Wu
Arachniodes yakusimensis (H.Itô) Nakaike
Arachniodes ziyunshanensis Y.T.Xie

Some hybrids were also accepted:

Arachniodes × azuminoensis Fujiw., Y.Matsuda, Yu. Abe & Otsuka
Arachniodes × chibaensis Yashiro
Arachniodes × clivorum Kurata
Arachniodes × ikeminensis Seriz.
Arachniodes × kenzo-satakei (Kurata) Kurata
Arachniodes × kurosawae Shimura & Kurata
Arachniodes × masakii Kurata
Arachniodes × minamitanii Sa. Kurata
Arachniodes × mirabilis Sa. Kurata
Arachniodes × mitsuyoshiana Sa. Kurata
Arachniodes × pseudohekiana Kurata
Arachniodes × respiciens Sa. Kurata
Arachniodes × sahashii Fraser-Jenk. & Kandel
Arachniodes × sasamotoi Kurata
Arachniodes × takayamensis Seriz.

References

External links

Dryopteridaceae
Fern genera
Taxonomy articles created by Polbot